The Elite is a professional wrestling stable currently appearing in the American professional wrestling promotion All Elite Wrestling (AEW). The group currently consists of Kenny Omega and The Young Bucks (Matt Jackson and Nick Jackson), and are typically accompanied by Don Callis, Brandon Cutler, and Michael Nakazawa. They were the inaugural and two-time AEW World Trios Champions. Omega also makes appearances for New Japan Pro-Wrestling (NJPW), where he is a two-time and current IWGP United States Heavyweight Champion.

The Elite was originally formed in January 2016 as a trio acting as a sub-group within Bullet Club, a larger stable of which Omega was the leader. Together, the trio captured the NEVER Openweight 6-Man Tag Team Championship twice later that year, but continued their alliance beyond that point, with The Young Bucks notably acting as valets for Omega in his singles career. Other titles won by members as part of the stable include the IWGP Heavyweight Championship, IWGP Intercontinental Championship, IWGP United States Heavyweight Championship, and AAA Mega Championship for Omega, while The Young Bucks won the IWGP Junior Heavyweight Tag Team Championship seven times, the IWGP Heavyweight Tag Team Championship once, the ROH World Tag Team Championship three times, and the AAA World Tag Team Championship one time.

In October 2018, after a lengthy internal feud within Bullet Club, Omega and The Young Bucks' 'Elite' faction left the group. Cody Rhodes, Adam Page, and Marty Scurll, all of whom had sided with Omega during the feud, also left to formally join The Elite on October 30, 2018, alongside Omega's tag partner in Golden☆Lovers, Kota Ibushi, making it a full-scale stable. During the following three months, the members of The Elite would leave most of their other promotions to work almost exclusively with AEW, minus Scurll and Ibushi, who chose to remain in Ring of Honor and New Japan Pro-Wrestling, respectively, leaving the stable. The five, who were instrumental in the creation of the company and hold positions as executive vice presidents (except for Page), would play a pivotal role in AEW, both on-screen and off-screen.

Cody would eventually leave the group to focus on his own Nightmare Family stable, as would Page following a falling out with Omega and the Bucks. In December 2020, Don Callis, an executive vice president of Impact Wrestling, came to AEW as a guest of Omega and aided him in winning the AEW World Championship. Omega then began making appearances in Impact Wrestling alongside Callis, eventually winning the Impact World Championship, and reestablished ties with past Bullet Club teammates and Impact wrestlers Doc Gallows and Karl Anderson. Omega would claim to have "reformed the old Bullet Club", and once the group merged with the trio of remaining Elite members, Callis would take credit for "reforming" The Elite, which he called a "new Elite" and later dub "The Super Elite". Following the dissolution of AEW and Impact's partnership, Callis remained with The Elite while Gallows and Anderson quietly left, and were replaced in the group by Adam Cole, Bobby Fish, and Kyle O'Reilly, who all left in August 2022. Throughout this time, The Elite would collectively win the AEW World Tag Team Championship three times, once by Omega with Page and a record-setting two-times by The Young Bucks. The Elite would also become the inaugural AEW World Trios Champions in September 2022.

Background

Prior to the 2016 formation of The Elite, Kenny Omega and The Young Bucks (Matt Jackson and Nick Jackson) had known each other for years. They originally met in Japan in 2008, when Omega was on his first tour with the Dramatic Dream Team (DDT) promotion and The Young Bucks were on their first tour with the Dragon Gate promotion. They became close friends after later meetings in other promotions, including California promotion Pro Wrestling Guerrilla (PWG). Omega has stated that the three had always thought that they shared the same brain, having the same thoughts about what a wrestling match should be. Matt Jackson has described the creative chemistry between the three as unlike anything they have experienced before, adding "There's magic there".

Omega, who has called The Young Bucks his best friends and closest allies in professional wrestling, has stated that the three have "an open line of communication sending messages all day". The Elite was created as a result of one of these "think-tank sessions", during which the three came up with the idea of filming their moments away from the ring and sharing them with their fans. These moments, some only loosely tied to professional wrestling, were used to create Being The Elite, a show produced by The Young Bucks and released on both Twitter and YouTube.

In 2016, the three were affiliated with each other in NJPW as members of Bullet Club, but in Omega's words they felt that the stable had been watered down and wanted to create something new. Omega claimed that whenever people were saying that Bullet Club had been doing "some really cool stuff", they were in fact always talking about the three of them and not the other members of the stable. Wanting to be together both in the ring and outside of it, the three decided to go full-bore as The Elite. They had come up with the name The Elite as a joke years earlier, when trying to come up with a list of the most elite wrestlers in the world. Omega stated that he and The Young Bucks wanted to push themselves as The Elite, but accepted if NJPW continued calling them Bullet Club "in parentheses" as the stable was their "cash cow" and a "pop-culture phenomenon". Omega has described The Elite as "a place you can go to watch the most ridiculous and entertaining stuff in pro wrestling".

History

ROH/NJPW (2016-2019)

Formation (2016–2017) 

On January 5, 2016, Omega took over the Bullet Club as its new leader, turning its members, including The Young Bucks, on previous figurehead A.J. Styles, kicking him out of the group. According to The Young Bucks, they and Omega created The Elite that night without ever asking permission from NJPW bookers. After the rest of Bullet Club had left the ring after turning on Styles, Omega allegedly asked The Young Bucks if just the three of them should return to the ring to continue the attack on Styles as a "signal to the audience that [they were] the three guys". The three agreed to return to the ring and The Elite was born.

During the first months of The Elite's existence, The Young Bucks, who were the reigning IWGP Junior Heavyweight Tag Team Champions when the group was formed, both lost and regained the title while Omega did the same with the IWGP Intercontinental Championship. The Elite won its first title as a trio during the NJPW and Ring of Honor (ROH) co-produced Honor Rising: Japan 2016 show on February 20, when they defeated The Briscoes (Jay Briscoe and Mark Briscoe) and Toru Yano for the NEVER Openweight 6-Man Tag Team Championship. They went on to defend the title in the United States for ROH. The Elite lost the NEVER Openweight 6-Man Tag Team Championship to Hiroshi Tanahashi, Michael Elgin and Yoshitatsu on April 10 at Invasion Attack 2016, only to regain it from them on May 3 at Wrestling Dontaku 2016. Their second reign ended on July 3, when they were defeated by Matt Sydal, Ricochet and Satoshi Kojima.

On August 14, Omega made history by becoming the first non-Japanese wrestler to win NJPW's premier tournament, the G1 Climax, defeating Hirooki Goto in the finals. For the rest of the year, The Elite was largely inactive, with Omega defending his newly won status as the number one contender to the IWGP Heavyweight Championship while The Young Bucks concentrated on tag team matches, winning the ROH World Tag Team Championship in September. On January 4, 2017, The Elite was involved in two championship matches at NJPW's biggest event of the year, Wrestle Kingdom 11 in Tokyo Dome. Early in the show, The Young Bucks lost the IWGP Junior Heavyweight Championship to Roppongi Vice (Beretta and Rocky Romero) while in the main event of the show Omega unsuccessfully challenged Kazuchika Okada for the IWGP Heavyweight Championship. The main event match earned acclaim from journalists and industry veterans with some ranking it among the greatest professional wrestling matches ever.

Tension in The Elite and The Golden Elite (2017–2018) 
After months of inactivity as a trio, The Elite reunited in April 2017 by embarking on a tour of the United Kingdom, during which they wrestled for Discovery Wrestling, Fight Club: Pro, Over the Top Wrestling and Revolution Pro Wrestling. Meanwhile, a storyline had started involving tension between Omega and Bullet Club stablemate Adam Cole, who had formed his own trio named Superkliq with The Young Bucks, who were now caught in the middle of Omega and Cole. The storyline culminated on May 12, when after teasing dissension with Omega they turned on Cole, who was fired from Bullet Club by Omega. On June 11 at Dominion 6.11 in Osaka-jo Hall, The Young Bucks regained the IWGP Junior Heavyweight Tag Team Championship from Roppongi Vice. Over the weekend of July 1 and 2 at G1 Special in USA, Omega defeated Michael Elgin, Jay Lethal and finally Tomohiro Ishii to win an eight-man tournament and become the inaugural IWGP United States Heavyweight Champion. On August 13, The Young Bucks lost the IWGP Junior Heavyweight Tag Team Championship to Funky Future (Ricochet and Ryusuke Taguchi). Later that same day, Omega was defeated in the finals of the 2017 G1 Climax by Tetsuya Naito. On September 2, The Elite returned to the United States, making their debut for The Young Bucks' Southern California home promotion Pro Wrestling Guerrilla (PWG) and defeating Flamita, Penta 0M and Rey Fenix in a six-man tag team main event.

Upon Omega's return to ROH in October 2017, The Elite started defending the ROH World Six-Man Tag Team Championship, which The Young Bucks officially held with Bullet Club stablemate Adam Page.

In January 2018 at The New Beginning in Sapporo, Omega was betrayed by Bullet Club stablemate Cody after shoving Matt Jackson and subsequently reunited with his former Golden Lovers partner Kota Ibushi, leaving the future of The Elite in jeopardy.

On March 28 at Strong Style Evolved, The Young Bucks faced off against the Golden Lovers in a losing effort. After the match, Nick Jackson shook hands and embraced with Omega, but Matt Jackson refused and rolled out of the ring.

During Omega and Cody's bout at Ring of Honor's Supercard of Honor XII on April 7, The Young Bucks interfered and attempted to turn on Cody, but instead accidentally superkicked Omega, causing Cody to get the pinfall victory. After the match, The Young Bucks attempted to explain what had happened to Omega, but he shoved Matt Jackson and left.

On the 100th episode of Being The Elite, "Finale", Omega declared their friendship over and that "There is no Elite" in anger over the Young Bucks' involvement in his match, apparently ending the stable for the time being while Scurll left to pursue a music career and The Young Bucks, Page and Burnard the Business Bear walked out on Cody's invitation to celebrate his win over Omega, leaving him alone in the locker room to ponder what he's done and what it cost.

On June 9 at NJPW's Dominion 6.9 in Osaka-jo Hall, The Young Bucks won the IWGP Heavyweight Tag Team Championship and in the main event Omega won the IWGP Heavyweight Championship. After the match, The Young Bucks came out, congratulated and hugged it out with Omega and Ibushi, thus mergering the Golden Lovers and Elite into a four-man team now named The Golden Elite. At a press conference aired on NJPW World, Omega clarified that going forward "Ibushi is a member of the Elite," but not Bullet Club.

On July 7, 2018, at G1 Special in San Francisco, Cody ended his rivalry with Omega after being attacked by the BC Firing Squad after he unsuccessfully challenged him for the IWGP Heavyweight Championship.

Member changes (2018–2019) 
In July 2018 the Nick and Matt Jackson temporarily fractured from the Bullet Club and formed the "Alpha Club" with Chris Jericho (aka. "The Bucks of Jericho or is it Y2Jackson") which culminated in a one night match on the Jericho Cruise against the Bullet Club (represented by Omega, Cody, and Scurll) to reunite the group. On the Talk is Jericho podcast on October 30 following the match, Matt Jackson confirmed that Cody, Page, and Marty Scurll were now officially in The Elite, and that The Elite had fully split from Bullet Club, ending a civil war between the Bullet Club "OGs" and The Elite.

On November 8, 2018, New Japan Pro-Wrestling announced Page and former Bullet Club stablemate Yujiro Takahashi would represent The Elite at the 2018 World Tag League Tournament.

On December 15, 2018, The Elite, minus Scurll who remains under contract, officially left ROH, following the Final Battle (2018) pay-per-view. They gave a post show speech to the crowd along with Christopher Daniels, Frankie Kazarian, and Scorpio Sky. Scurll went on to form a new faction in Ring of Honor, Villain Enterprises, with the debuting PCO, and Brody King, later adding Flip Gordon.

All Elite Wrestling (2019–present)

AEW beginnings (2019–2020) 
On January 1, 2019, The Elite announced the formation of a new wrestling promotion, All Elite Wrestling (AEW), as well as a follow-up to All In, called Double or Nothing. Their promotion was revealed to include Cody, The Young Bucks, Hangman Page, Pac, SoCal Uncensored, Joey Janela, Britt Baker, Penelope Ford, Brandi Rhodes, and Chris Jericho, among others. The Young Bucks and Kenny Omega had their first match in AEW as The Elite at AEW Fyter Fest defeating Lucha Brothers and Laredo Kid.

In 2019, The Elite began a feud with Chris Jericho and later his Inner Circle stable, with Omega and Page losing to Jericho at AEW Double or Nothing and AEW All Out respectively.

At AEW Full Gear, Cody unsuccessfully challenged Jericho for the AEW World Championship with the condition that he will never challenge for title again while The Young Bucks lost to Santana and Ortiz. On the January 22, 2020 episode of AEW Dynamite during Chris Jericho's Rock 'N' Wrestling Rager at Sea, Omega and Page defeated SoCal Uncensored (Frankie Kazarian and Scorpio Sky) for the AEW World Tag Team Championship.

On the November 18 episode of Being the Elite, Hangman Page attempted to part ways with the group, leading to months of tension between himself, the Young Bucks (especially Matt Jackson), and his tag partner Omega. Following the March 4, 2020 episode of Dynamite (and shown on the March 8 episode of Being the Elite), Hangman Page formally parted ways with The Elite, but still remained a peripheral member on the verge of permanently leaving.

In a May 2020 interview, Cody Rhodes discussed the status of the Elite's members, stating that the 'OG' Elite (Bucks, Omega) will always determine who joins the group, and that it's "their world" that he's honored to take part in. He also clarified that Hangman Page and Marty Scurll were part of the "expanded universe" of the group, and that Matt Hardy also was an honorary member. On the August 27 episode of AEW Dynamite, Page was officially kicked out of The Elite for costing The Young Bucks a future opportunity to challenge for Page and Omega's World Tag Team Championship.

Championship dominance and Super Elite (2020–2022) 
At Full Gear, The Young Bucks won the AEW World Tag Team Championships in a match against champions FTR. Omega, with assistance from Don Callis defeated Jon Moxley for the AEW World Championship on December 2, 2020. On the December 15, 2020, edition of Impact Wrestling, Omega allied with former Bullet Club teammates Doc Gallows and Karl Anderson, with Omega stating he had "reformed the old Bullet Club." The re-united Bullet Club would continue its presence into the new year, and on the January 6 episode of AEW Dynamite Gallows and Anderson saved Omega from an attack by Jon Moxley, and reunited with the Young Bucks to merge into a five-man group. On the January 11 episode of Being The Elite ("The Band is Back Together"), Matt Hardy asked Matt Jackson "Is the Bullet Club back together?" to which he replied, "it's complicated." On January 15, a match involving 'The Elite' was billed, but last minute was changed by Callis to be Omega and the Good Brothers. NJPW Bullet Club founding member Tama Tonga addressed this faction of former Bullet Club members on Twitter, calling them a "bootleg Bullet Club.".

At Impact Wrestling's Hard to Kill PPV Omega, Anderson, and Gallows defeated Rich Swann, Chris Sabin, and Moose, notably now wearing Bullet Club themed attire.  At Beach Break on February 3, Omega, Anderson, and Gallows defeated the team of Jon Moxley, Rey Fenix, and PAC.  After the match, Bullet Club member Kenta appeared and launched a sneak attack on current IWGP United States Champion Jon Moxley after Moxley attacked Kenny Omega. After the show, Omega said he would team with Kenta in a match against Moxley and Lance Archer.

In April 2021, The Young Bucks, who had been wary of Omega's relationship with Callis, Gallows, and Anderson, would cement their commitment to Omega by turning on Jon Moxley during a six-man tag team match on Dynamite, when they wrestled against Omega, Anderson, and Gallows.

In September 2021, at All Out, The Young Bucks lost their AEW world tag team championships to Lucha Brothers in a Steel Cage. After Omega retained the AEW World championship against Christian Cage in a title match in the main event, the Elite came out to attack Cage. Jurassic Express ran in to aid Cage, but was outnumbered. The Elite was interrupted by the debuting Adam Cole, who hit the superkick to Jungle Boy, joining the Elite. As the Elite was about to end the show, the debuting Bryan Danielson attacked the Elite, aiding Cage and Jurassic Express. Danielson, Cage and Jurassic Express stood tall at the end of the show.

In October 2021, following Impact's Bound for Glory pay-per-view, it was reported that the partnership between AEW and Impact had ended, and with that, Gallows and Anderson quietly were removed from the Elite. After losing the AEW World Championship to Adam Page at Full Gear, Omega announced on the following Dynamite that he would be taking a leave of absence, leaving The Young Bucks to "hold down the fort". Cole, however, would add former Undisputed Era stablemates Bobby Fish and Kyle O'Reilly to the group.

Return to original line-up and suspension (2022–present) 
On the July 27, 2022 special episode of Dynamite titled Fight for the Fallen, AEW announced a tournament for the inaugural AEW World Trios Championship, which would culminate at the All Out pay-per-view on September 4, 2022.  On the August 3rd episode of Dynamite, Adam Cole made his return from injury with the rest of The Undisputed Elite, stating his intentions to win the new AEW World Trios Championship with Kyle O'Reilly and Bobby Fish. Cole, Fish and O'Reilly then attacked the Young Bucks, turning them face as Cole, Fish, and O'Reilly left The Elite. 'Hangman' Adam Page would save the Bucks from a further attack. Later that night The Bucks would try and thank Page for his help, but were interrupted by The Dark Order. On the August 10th episode of Dynamite, The Young Bucks once again asked Page to join them in the Trios tournament. Page turned down the offer saying he would be in the corner of The Dark Order. On the August 17 episode of Dynamite, the Young Bucks were joined by the returning Omega; his first match in over nine months. Omega and the Bucks advanced to the tournament finals where they defeated the team of the Dark Order (Alex Reynolds and John Silver) and Adam Page to become the inaugural AEW Trios Champions.

On the September 7 episode of Dynamite, due to an altercation with CM Punk after the media scrum following All Out, Tony Khan announced that all members of The Elite were stripped of the AEW World Trios Championship. It was reported earlier from multiple sources that all members of The Elite were suspended because of the altercation.

At Full Gear 2022, The Elite returned in a trios match against Death Triangle for the AEW World Trios Championship, where they were unsuccessful after Rey Fenix used the ring hammer against Kenny Omega to knock him out and win the match.  The match at Full Gear would be the start of a best of seven series between The Elite and Death Triangle, which spanned two months and culminated in a seventh and deciding match on the January 11, 2023 edition of Dynamite, where, in a ladder match, The Elite would win the series 4-3, and their second AEW World Trios Championship. The Elite lost the titles to The House of Black at AEW Revolution, ending their second reign at 53 days.

Being The Elite 

Being The Elite debuted on YouTube in May 2016 and has since aired on average once or twice a week. The show is shot and edited entirely on an iPhone with the members of The Elite holding complete creative control over the content. Originally intended as a promotional vehicle and a video journal of The Young Bucks & Kenny Omega's life on the road, it has since evolved into a hybrid that also includes skits and storyline developments involving both The Elite and Bullet Club. In early 2017, Being The Elite provided the background for an angle that culminated at War of the Worlds in May with The Elite turning on Adam Cole and kicking him out of Bullet Club. While ROH had previously shown that there was tension between Cole and The Young Bucks, Being The Elite went deeper into the background for the angle with a storyline that involved tension between Cole and Omega and their fight for The Young Bucks' loyalty while also introducing Scurll, who would go on to become Cole's replacement in Bullet Club.

On January 1, 2019, an episode of Being The Elite was used to announce the formation of a new wrestling promotion, All Elite Wrestling (AEW), as well as a follow-up to All In, called Double or Nothing. Since the formation of AEW, the show has also advanced AEW storylines, debuted new signees, and promoted upcoming AEW shows.

Being the Elite went on hiatus in September 12, 2022, after The Elite's suspension due to their altercation with CM Punk. It returned after they came back at Full Gear.

Members

Current

Former

Associates

Former associates

Timeline

Sub-groups

Current

Former

Championships and accomplishments

4 Front Wrestling
4FW Junior Heavyweight Championship (1 time) – Omega
 All Elite Wrestling
 AEW World Championship (1 time) – Omega
AEW World Tag Team Championship (3 times) – Omega and Page (1), The Young Bucks (2)
 AEW World Trios Championship (2 times, inaugural) – Omega and The Young Bucks
 AEW World Trios Championship Tournament (2022) - Omega and The Young Bucks
Men's Casino Battle Royale (2 times) – Page (2019), O'Reilly (2022)
Casino Tag Team Royale (1 time) – The Young Bucks (2022)
 Owen Hart Cup (1 time) – Cole
 Dynamite Award (1 time)
 "Bleacher Report PPV Moment of the Year" (2021) – Page, Omega, Hardy, and Young Bucks - Stadium Stampede match (The Elite vs. The Inner Circle) at Double or Nothing
DDT Pro-Wrestling
Ironman Heavymetalweight Championship (2 times) – The Young Bucks, Brandi Rhodes
Global Force Wrestling
GFW NEX*GEN Championship (1 time) – Cody
Impact Wrestling
Impact World Championship (1 time) – Omega
Impact World Tag Team Championship (2 times) – The Good Brothers
Lucha Libre AAA Worldwide
AAA Mega Championship (1 time) – Omega
AAA World Tag Team Championship (1 time) – The Young Bucks
New Japan Pro-Wrestling
IWGP Heavyweight Championship (1 time) – Omega
IWGP Intercontinental Championship (1 time) – Omega
IWGP United States Championship (3 times, current) – Omega (2, current) and Cody (1)
IWGP Junior Heavyweight Championship (1 time) – Scurll
IWGP Junior Heavyweight Tag Team Championship (7 times) – The Young Bucks
IWGP Tag Team Championship (1 time) – The Young Bucks
NEVER Openweight 6-Man Tag Team Championship (3 times) – Omega and The Young Bucks (2), Scurll and The Young Bucks (1)
G1 Climax (2016) – Omega
IWGP United States Championship Tournament (2017) – Omega
Tag Team Turbulence Tournament (2021) – Gallows and Anderson
National Wrestling Alliance
NWA World Heavyweight Championship (1 time) – Cody
Pro Wrestling Guerrilla
PWG World Tag Team Championship (1 time) – The Young Bucks
Pro Wrestling Illustrated
Feud of the Year (2017) 
Match of the Year (2017) 
Match of the Year (2018) 
Match of the Year (2019) 
 Match of the Year (2020) 
Tag Team of the Year (2017, 2018) – The Young Bucks
Ranked Omega No. 1 of the top 500 singles wrestlers in the PWI 500 in 2018 and 2021
Ring of Honor
ROH World Heavyweight Championship – Cody (1)
ROH World Tag Team Championship (3 times) – The Young Bucks
ROH World Six-Man Tag Team Championship (2 times) – Page and The Young Bucks (1), Cody and The Young Bucks (1)
ROH World Television Championship (1 time) – Scurll
Wrestler of the Year (2017) – Cody
Tag Team of the Year (2017) – The Young Bucks
Best Final Battle Entrance (2017) – Scurll
Breakout Star of the Year (2017) – Page
 Feud of the Year (2018) 
Survival of the Fittest (2018) – Scurll
SoCal Uncensored
Match of the Year (2016) The Young Bucks with Adam Cole vs. Matt Sydal, Ricochet and Will Ospreay on September 3
Match of the Year (2017) Omega vs. Tomohiro Ishii on July 2
Match of the Year (2018) 
Sports Illustrated
Wrestler of the Year (2017) – Omega
Wrestler of the Year (2018) – Cody
Tokyo Sports
Technique Award (2016) – Omega
Best Bout Award (2017) 
Best Bout Award (2018) 
Weekly Pro Wrestling
Best Bout Award (2016) 
Best Bout Award (2017) 
Best Bout Award (2018) 
Best Foreigner Award (2016–2018) – Omega
What Culture Pro Wrestling/Defiant Wrestling
WCPW/Defiant Championship (1 time) – Scurll
WCPW Internet Championship (1 time) – Cody
World Series Wrestling
WSW Tag Team Championship (1 time) – The Young Bucks
WSW Tag Team Title Tournament (2018) – The Young Bucks
Wrestling Observer Newsletter
Wrestling Observer Newsletter Hall of Fame (Class of 2020) – Omega
Best Pro Wrestling Book (2020) 
Best Wrestling Maneuver (2016–2018, 2020) – Omega (for the One-Winged Angel)
Feud of the Year (2017) 
Feud of the Year (2021) 
Japan MVP (2018) – Omega
 United States/Canada MVP (2021) - Omega 
Most Improved (2018) – Page
Most Outstanding Wrestler (2018, 2020) – Omega 
Pro Wrestling Match of the Year (2017) 
Pro Wrestling Match of the Year (2018) 
Pro Wrestling Match of the Year (2020) 
Tag Team of the Year (2016–2018, 2020-2021) – The Young Bucks
Tag Team of the Decade (2010s) – The Young Bucks
Wrestler of the Year (2018, 2021) – Omega

Notes

References

External links

All Elite Wrestling teams and stables
Bullet Club members
Independent promotions teams and stables
New Japan Pro-Wrestling teams and stables
Ring of Honor teams and stables